Passiflora anfracta is a species of flowering plant in the Passifloraceae family. It is a passion flower that is endemic to Ecuador.

References

anfracta
Endemic flora of Ecuador
Endangered plants
Taxonomy articles created by Polbot
Taxa named by Édouard André
Taxa named by Maxwell T. Masters